In theoretical physics, the term renormalization group (RG) refers to a formal apparatus that allows systematic  investigation of the changes of a physical system as viewed at different scales. In particle physics, it reflects the changes in the underlying force laws (codified in a quantum field theory) as  the energy scale at which physical processes occur varies, energy/momentum  and resolution distance scales being effectively conjugate under the uncertainty principle.

A change in scale is called a scale transformation.  The renormalization group is intimately related to scale invariance and conformal invariance, symmetries in which a system appears the same at all scales (so-called self-similarity).

As the scale varies, it is as if one is changing the magnifying power of a notional microscope viewing the system. In so-called renormalizable theories, the system at one scale will generally consist of self-similar copies of itself when viewed at a smaller scale, with different parameters describing the components of the system. The components, or fundamental variables, may  relate to atoms, elementary particles, atomic spins, etc.  The parameters of the theory typically describe the interactions of the components. These may be variable couplings which measure the strength of various forces, or mass parameters themselves. The components themselves may appear to be composed of more of the self-same components as one goes to shorter distances.

For example, in quantum electrodynamics (QED), an electron appears to be composed of electron and positron pairs and photons, as one views it at higher resolution, at very short distances. The electron at such short distances has a slightly different electric charge than does the dressed electron seen at large distances, and this change, or running, in the value of the electric charge is determined by the renormalization group equation.

History
The idea of scale transformations and scale invariance is old in physics: Scaling arguments were commonplace for the Pythagorean school, Euclid, and up to Galileo. They became popular again at the end of the 19th century, perhaps the first example being the idea of enhanced viscosity of Osborne Reynolds, as a way to explain turbulence.

The renormalization group was initially devised in particle physics, but nowadays its applications extend to solid-state physics, fluid mechanics, physical cosmology, and even nanotechnology. An early article by Ernst Stueckelberg and André Petermann in 1953 anticipates the idea in quantum field theory. Stueckelberg and Petermann opened the field conceptually. They noted that renormalization exhibits a group of transformations which transfer quantities from the bare terms to the counter terms. They introduced a function h(e) in  quantum electrodynamics (QED), which is now called the beta function (see below).

Beginnings
Murray Gell-Mann and Francis E. Low restricted the idea to scale transformations in QED in 1954, which are the most physically significant, and focused on asymptotic forms of the photon propagator at high energies.  They determined the variation of the electromagnetic coupling in QED, by appreciating the simplicity of the scaling structure of that theory. They thus discovered that the coupling parameter g(μ) at the energy scale μ is effectively given by the (one-dimensional translation) group equation

or equivalently, for some function G (unspecified—nowadays called Wegner's scaling function) and a constant d, in terms of the coupling g(M) at a reference scale M.

Gell-Mann and Low realized in these results that the effective scale can be arbitrarily taken as μ, and can vary to define the theory at any other scale:

The gist of the RG is this group property: as the scale μ varies, the theory presents a self-similar replica of itself, and any scale can be accessed similarly from any other scale, by group action, a formal transitive conjugacy of couplings in the mathematical sense (Schröder's equation).

On the basis of this (finite) group equation and its scaling property, Gell-Mann and Low could then focus on infinitesimal transformations, and invented a computational method based on a mathematical flow function  of the coupling parameter g, which they introduced. Like the function h(e) of Stueckelberg and Petermann, their function determines the differential change of the coupling g(μ) with respect to a small change in energy scale μ through a differential equation, the renormalization group equation:

The modern name is also indicated, the beta function, introduced by C. Callan and K. Symanzik in 1970. Since it is a mere function of g, integration in g of a perturbative estimate of it permits specification of the renormalization trajectory of the coupling, that is, its variation with energy, effectively the function G in this perturbative approximation. The renormalization group prediction (cf.

Deeper understanding 
The renormalization group emerges from the renormalization of the quantum field variables, which normally has to address the problem of infinities in a quantum field theory. This problem of systematically handling the infinities of quantum field theory to obtain finite physical quantities was solved for QED by Richard Feynman, Julian Schwinger and Shin'ichirō Tomonaga, who received the 1965 Nobel prize for these contributions. They effectively devised the theory of mass and charge renormalization, in which the infinity in the momentum scale is cut off by an ultra-large regulator, Λ.

The dependence of physical quantities, such as the electric charge or electron mass, on the scale Λ is hidden, effectively swapped for the longer-distance scales at which the physical quantities are measured, and, as a result, all observable quantities end up being finite instead, even for an infinite Λ. Gell-Mann and Low thus realized in these results that, infinitesimally, while a tiny change in  g is provided by the above RG equation given ψ(g), the self-similarity is expressed by the fact that ψ(g) depends explicitly only upon the parameter(s) of the theory, and not upon the scale μ. Consequently, the above renormalization group equation may be solved for (G and thus) g(μ).

A deeper understanding of the physical meaning and generalization of the renormalization process, which goes beyond the dilation group of conventional renormalizable theories, considers  methods where widely different scales of lengths appear simultaneously. It came from condensed matter physics: Leo P. Kadanoff's paper in 1966 proposed the "block-spin" renormalization group. The "blocking idea" is a way to define the components of the theory at large distances as aggregates of components at shorter distances.

This approach covered the conceptual point and was given full computational substance in the extensive important contributions of Kenneth Wilson. The power of Wilson's ideas was demonstrated by a constructive iterative renormalization solution of a long-standing problem, the Kondo problem, in 1975, as well as the preceding seminal developments of his new method in the theory of second-order phase transitions and critical phenomena in 1971. He was awarded the Nobel prize for these decisive contributions in 1982.

Reformulation
Meanwhile, the RG in particle physics had been reformulated in more practical terms by Callan and Symanzik in 1970. The above beta function, which describes the "running of the coupling" parameter with scale, was also found to amount to the "canonical trace anomaly", which represents the quantum-mechanical breaking of scale (dilation) symmetry in a field theory. Applications of the RG to particle physics exploded in number in the 1970s with the establishment of the Standard Model.

In 1973, it was discovered that a theory of interacting colored quarks, called quantum chromodynamics, had a negative beta function. This special value is the scale of the strong interactions,  =  and occurs at about 200 MeV. Conversely, the coupling becomes weak at very high energies (asymptotic freedom), and the quarks become observable as point-like particles, in deep inelastic scattering, as anticipated by Feynman–Bjorken scaling. QCD was thereby established as the quantum field theory controlling the strong interactions of particles.

Momentum space RG also became a highly developed tool in solid state physics, but was hindered by the extensive use of perturbation theory, which prevented the theory from succeeding in strongly correlated systems.

Conformal symmetry 
Conformal symmetry is associated with the vanishing of the beta function. This can occur naturally if a coupling constant is attracted, by running, toward a fixed point at which β(g) = 0. In QCD, the fixed point occurs at short distances where g → 0 and is called a (trivial) ultraviolet fixed point. For heavy quarks, such as the top quark, the coupling to the mass-giving Higgs boson runs toward a fixed non-zero (non-trivial) infrared fixed point, first predicted by Pendleton and Ross (1981), and C. T. Hill. 
The top quark Yukawa coupling lies slightly below the infrared fixed point of the Standard Model suggesting the possibility of additional new physics, such as sequential heavy Higgs bosons.

In string theory, conformal invariance of the string world-sheet is a fundamental symmetry: β = 0 is a requirement. Here, β is a function of the geometry of the space-time in which the string moves. This determines the space-time dimensionality of the string theory and enforces Einstein's equations of general relativity on the geometry. The RG is of fundamental importance to string theory and theories of grand unification.

It is also the modern key idea underlying critical phenomena in condensed matter physics. Indeed, the RG has become one of the most important tools of modern physics. It is often used in combination with the Monte Carlo method.

Block spin
This section introduces pedagogically a picture of RG which may be easiest to grasp: the block spin RG, devised by Leo P. Kadanoff in 1966.

Consider a 2D solid, a set of atoms in a perfect square array, as depicted in the figure.

Assume that atoms interact among themselves only with their nearest neighbours, and that the system is at a given temperature . The strength of their interaction is quantified by a certain coupling . The physics of the system will be described by a certain formula, say the Hamiltonian .

Now proceed to divide the solid into blocks of 2×2 squares; we attempt to describe the system in terms of block variables, i.e., variables which describe the average behavior of the block. (This isn't exactly true, in general, but it is often a good first approximation.)

Perhaps, the initial problem was too hard to solve, since there were too many atoms. Now, in the renormalized problem we have only one fourth of them. But why stop now? We are increasing the observation scale with each RG step.

Of course, the best idea is to iterate until there is only one very big block. Often, when iterated many times, this RG transformation leads to a certain number of fixed points.

To be more concrete, consider a magnetic system (e.g., the Ising model), in which the  coupling denotes the trend of neighbour spins to be parallel. The configuration of the system is the result of the tradeoff between the ordering  term and the disordering effect of temperature.

For many models of this kind there are three fixed points: 
This means that, at the largest size, temperature becomes unimportant, i.e., the disordering factor vanishes. Thus, in large scales, the system appears to be ordered. We are in a ferromagnetic phase.
Exactly the opposite; here, temperature dominates, and the system is disordered at large scales.
In this point, changing the scale does not change the physics, because the system is in a fractal state. It corresponds to the Curie phase transition, and is also called a critical point.

Elementary theory
In more technical terms, let us assume that we have a theory described by a certain function  of the state variables  and a certain set of coupling constants . This function may be a partition function, an action, a Hamiltonian, etc. It must contain the whole description of the physics of the system.

If this is achievable by a certain change in the parameters, then the theory is said to be renormalizable.

Most fundamental theories of physics such as quantum electrodynamics, quantum chromodynamics and electro-weak interaction, but not gravity, are exactly renormalizable. Also, most theories in condensed matter physics are approximately renormalizable, from superconductivity to fluid turbulence.

The change in the parameters is implemented by a certain beta function: , which is said to induce a renormalization group flow (or RG flow) on the -space. The values of  under the flow are called running couplings.

As was stated in the previous section, the most important information in the RG flow are its fixed points. The possible macroscopic states of the system, at a large scale, are given by this set of fixed points. If these fixed points correspond to a free field theory, the theory is said to exhibit quantum triviality, possessing what is called a Landau pole, as in quantum electrodynamics.  For a 4 interaction, Michael Aizenman proved that this theory is indeed trivial, for space-time dimension  ≥ 5. For  = 4, the triviality has yet to be proven rigorously (pending recent submission to the arxiv), but lattice computations have provided strong evidence for this.  This fact is important as quantum triviality can be used to bound or even predict parameters such as the Higgs boson mass in asymptotic safety scenarios. Numerous fixed points appear in the study of lattice Higgs theories, but the nature of the quantum field theories associated with these remains an open question.

Since the RG transformations in such systems are lossy (i.e.: the number of variables decreases - see as an example in a different context, Lossy data compression), there need not be an inverse for a given RG transformation. Thus, in such lossy systems, the renormalization group is, in fact, a semigroup, as lossiness implies that there is no unique inverse for each element.

Relevant and irrelevant operators and universality classes

Consider a certain observable  of a physical system undergoing an RG transformation. The magnitude of the observable as the length scale of the system goes from small to large determines the importance of the observable(s) for the scaling law:

A relevant observable is needed to describe the macroscopic behaviour of the system; irrelevant observables are not needed. Marginal observables may or may not need to be taken into account. A remarkable broad fact is that most observables are irrelevant, i.e., the macroscopic physics is dominated by only a few observables in most systems.

As an example, in microscopic physics, to describe a system consisting of a mole of carbon-12 atoms we need of the order of 10 (the Avogadro number) variables, while to describe it as a macroscopic system (12 grams of carbon-12) we only need a few.

Before Wilson's RG approach, there was an astonishing empirical fact to explain: The coincidence of the critical exponents (i.e., the exponents of the reduced-temperature dependence of several quantities near a second order phase transition) in very disparate phenomena, such as magnetic systems, superfluid transition (Lambda transition), alloy physics, etc. So in general, thermodynamic features of a system near a phase transition depend only on a small number of variables, such as the dimensionality and symmetry, but are insensitive to details of the underlying microscopic properties of the system.

This coincidence of critical exponents for ostensibly quite different physical systems, called universality, is easily explained using the renormalization group, by demonstrating that the differences in phenomena among the individual fine-scale components are determined by irrelevant observables, while the relevant observables are shared in common. Hence many macroscopic phenomena may be grouped into a small set of universality classes, specified by the shared sets of relevant observables.

Momentum space
Renormalization groups, in practice, come in two main "flavours". The Kadanoff picture explained above refers mainly to the so-called real-space RG.

Momentum-space RG on the other hand, has a longer history despite its relative subtlety.  It can be used for systems where the degrees of freedom can be cast in terms of the Fourier modes of a given field. The RG transformation proceeds by integrating out a certain set of high-momentum (large-wavenumber) modes. Since large wavenumbers are related to short-length scales, the momentum-space RG results in an essentially analogous coarse-graining effect as with real-space RG.

Momentum-space RG is usually performed on a perturbation expansion. The validity of such an expansion is predicated upon the actual physics of a system being close to that of a free field system. In this case, one may calculate observables by summing the leading terms in the expansion. 
This approach has proved  successful for many theories, including most of particle physics, but fails for systems whose physics is very far from any free system, i.e., systems with strong correlations.

As an example of the physical meaning of RG in particle physics,  consider an overview of charge renormalization in quantum electrodynamics (QED). Suppose we have a point positive charge of a certain true (or bare) magnitude. The electromagnetic field around it has a certain energy, and thus may produce some virtual electron-positron pairs (for example). Although virtual particles annihilate very quickly, during their short lives the electron will be attracted by the charge, and the positron will be repelled. Since this happens uniformly everywhere near the point charge, where its electric field is sufficiently strong, these pairs effectively create a screen around the charge when viewed from far away. The measured strength of the charge will depend on how close our measuring probe can approach the point charge, bypassing more of the screen of virtual particles the closer it gets. Hence a dependence of a certain coupling constant (here, the electric charge) with distance scale.

Momentum and length scales are related inversely, according to the  de Broglie relation: The higher the energy or momentum scale we may reach, the lower the length scale we may probe and resolve. Therefore, the momentum-space RG practitioners sometimes claim to integrate out high momenta or high energy from their theories.

Exact renormalization group equations
An exact renormalization group equation (ERGE) is one that takes irrelevant couplings into account. There  are several formulations.

The Wilson ERGE is the simplest conceptually,  but is practically impossible to implement. Fourier transform into momentum space after Wick rotating into Euclidean space. The partition function is 

Obviously,

In fact, this transformation is transitive.

The Polchinski ERGE involves a smooth UV regulator cutoff. Basically, the idea is an improvement over the Wilson ERGE. Instead of a sharp momentum cutoff, it uses a smooth cutoff. Essentially, we suppress contributions from momenta greater than   heavily. The smoothness of the cutoff, however, allows us to derive a functional differential equation in the cutoff scale  . As in Wilson's approach, we have a different action functional for each cutoff energy scale  . Each of these actions are supposed to describe exactly the same model which means that their partition functionals have to match exactly.

In other words, (for a real scalar field; generalizations to other fields are obvious),

and ZΛ is really independent of ! We have used the condensed deWitt notation here. We have also split the bare action SΛ into a quadratic kinetic part and an interacting part Sint Λ. This split most certainly isn't clean. The "interacting" part can very well also contain quadratic kinetic terms. In fact, if there is any wave function renormalization, it most certainly will. This can be somewhat reduced by introducing field rescalings. RΛ is a function of the momentum p and the second term in the exponent is

when expanded.

When ,  is essentially 1. When ,  becomes very very huge and approaches infinity.  is always greater than or equal to 1 and is smooth. Basically, this leaves the fluctuations with momenta less than the cutoff  unaffected but heavily suppresses contributions from fluctuations with momenta greater than the cutoff. This is obviously a huge improvement over Wilson.

The condition that

can be satisfied by (but not only by)

Jacques Distler claimed without proof that this ERGE is not correct nonperturbatively.

The effective average action ERGE involves a smooth IR regulator cutoff. 
The idea is to take all fluctuations right up to an IR scale  into account. As the parameter  is lowered, the effective average action approaches the effective action which includes all quantum and classical fluctuations. In contrast, for large  the effective average action is close to the "bare action". So, the effective average action interpolates between the "bare action" and the effective action.

For a real scalar field, one adds an IR cutoff

to the action  , where Rk is a function of both   and   such that for 
Rk is both smooth and nonnegative. Its large value for small momenta leads to a suppression of their contribution to the partition function which is effectively the same thing as neglecting large-scale fluctuations.

One can use the condensed deWitt notation

for this IR regulator.

So,

where   is the source field. The Legendre transform of Wk ordinarily gives the effective action. However, the action that we started off with is really S[φ]+1/2 φ⋅Rk⋅φ and so, to get the effective average action, we subtract off 1/2 φ⋅Rk⋅φ. In other words,

can be inverted to give Jk[φ] and we define the effective average action Γk as

Hence,

thus

is the ERGE which is also known as the Wetterich equation. As shown by Morris  the effective action Γk is in fact simply related to Polchinski's effective action Sint via a Legendre transform relation.

As there are infinitely many choices of k, there are also infinitely many different interpolating ERGEs.
Generalization to other fields like spinorial fields is straightforward.

Although the Polchinski ERGE and the effective average action ERGE look similar, they are based upon very different philosophies. In the effective average action ERGE, the bare action is left unchanged (and the UV cutoff scale—if there is one—is also left unchanged) but the IR contributions to the effective action are suppressed whereas in the Polchinski ERGE, the QFT is fixed once and for all but the "bare action" is varied at different energy scales to reproduce the prespecified model. Polchinski's version is certainly much closer to Wilson's idea in spirit. Note that one uses "bare actions" whereas the other uses effective (average) actions.

Renormalization group improvement of the effective potential 
The renormalization group can also be used to compute effective potentials at orders higher than 1-loop. This kind of approach is particularly interesting to compute corrections to the Coleman–Weinberg  mechanism. To do so, one must write the renormalization group equation in terms of the effective potential. To the case of the  model:

 

In order to determine the effective potential, it is useful to write  as

 

where  is a power series in :

 

Using the above ansatz, it is possible to solve the renormalization group equation perturbatively and find the effective potential up to desired order. A pedagogical explanation of this technique is shown in reference.

See also

 Quantum triviality
 Scale invariance
 Schröder's equation
 Regularization (physics)
 Density matrix renormalization group
 Functional renormalization group
 Critical phenomena
 Universality (dynamical systems)
 C-theorem
 History of quantum field theory
 Top quark
 Asymptotic safety

Remarks

Citations

References

Historical references

Pedagogical and historical reviews
  The most successful variational RG method.
 
  A mathematical introduction and historical overview with a stress on group theory and the application in high-energy physics.
  A pedestrian introduction to renormalization and the renormalization group.
  A pedestrian introduction to the renormalization group as applied in condensed matter physics.

Books
T. D. Lee; Particle physics and introduction to field theory, Harwood academic publishers, 1981, . Contains a Concise, simple,  and trenchant summary of the group structure, in whose discovery he was also involved, as acknowledged in Gell-Mann and Low's paper.
L. Ts. Adzhemyan, N. V. Antonov and A. N. Vasiliev; The Field Theoretic Renormalization Group in Fully Developed Turbulence; Gordon and Breach, 1999. .
Vasil'ev, A. N.; The field theoretic renormalization group in critical behavior theory and stochastic dynamics; Chapman & Hall/CRC, 2004.  (Self-contained treatment of renormalization group applications with complete computations);
Zinn-Justin, Jean (2002). Quantum field theory and critical phenomena, Oxford, Clarendon Press (2002),  (an exceptionally solid and thorough treatise on both topics);
Zinn-Justin, Jean: Renormalization and renormalization group: From the discovery of UV divergences to the concept of effective field theories, in: de Witt-Morette C., Zuber J.-B. (eds), Proceedings of the NATO ASI on Quantum Field Theory: Perspective and Prospective, June 15–26, 1998, Les Houches, France, Kluwer Academic Publishers, NATO ASI Series C 530, 375-388 (1999)  [ISBN ]. Full text available in PostScript.
Kleinert, H. and Schulte Frohlinde, V; Critical Properties of 4-Theories, World Scientific (Singapore, 2001);  Paperback ''. Full text available in PDF.

 
Quantum field theory
Statistical mechanics
Scaling symmetries
Mathematical physics